Alexandra Swe Wagner (born November 27, 1977) is an American journalist. She is the host of both Alex Wagner Tonight on MSNBC and Netflix's The Mole reboot, as well as the author of FutureFace: A Family Mystery, an Epic Quest, and the Secret to Belonging (One World/Random House). She was a contributor for CBS News and is a contributing editor at The Atlantic. Previously, she was the anchor of the daytime program Now with Alex Wagner (2011–2015) on MSNBC and the co-host of The Circus on Showtime. From November 2016 until March  2018, she was a TV co-anchor on CBS This Morning Saturday. She has also been a senior editor at The Atlantic magazine since April 2016.

After serving as a fill-in host for both The Rachel Maddow Show and All In with Chris Hayes on MSNBC, she began hosting Alex Wagner Tonight on August 16, 2022.

Early life and education
Alex Wagner was born and raised in Washington, D.C. Her mother, Tin Swe Thant, is an immigrant from Yangon (Rangoon), Myanmar (Burma), who became a naturalized U.S. citizen before attending Swarthmore College. Her father, Carl Wagner, from Lansing, Iowa, was of Luxembourger and Irish descent and is a graduate of Loras College in Dubuque, Iowa, He was a prominent Democratic Party political consultant who co-chaired Bill Clinton's '92 presidential campaign. She attended Woodrow Wilson High School (renamed Jackson-Reed in 2022) and graduated from Brown University in 1999, having studied art history and literature. Wagner was raised Roman Catholic.

Career
Wagner has worked as the cultural correspondent for the Center for American Progress. From 2003 to 2007, she was editor-in-chief of The Fader magazine, covering music and cultural movements from around the world. She also served as executive director of Not On Our Watch Project, an advocacy organization focused on mass atrocities and human rights violations.

Wagner then became the White House correspondent for Politics Daily, a political news magazine under AOL News. She moved to The Huffington Post after it was acquired by AOL.

As an analyst on MSNBC, Wagner appeared on Countdown with Keith Olbermann and The Last Word with Lawrence O'Donnell.

On November 14, 2011, Wagner began hosting Now with Alex Wagner weekdays (originally at noon ET, but later at 4 PM ET). On July 30, 2015, MSNBC President Phil Griffin announced that the series had been cancelled in an effort to transition the network's daytime programming to more breaking news reporting and less political commentary and opinion. The next day the program aired its final episode. MSNBC later announced that Wagner would host a weekend program, but those plans were later abandoned.

On April 26, 2016, The Atlantic announced that Wagner was leaving MSNBC to join the magazine as a senior editor. In addition to writing for The Atlantic, Wagner would moderate events with AtlanticLIVE and help with developing video and TV projects with The Atlantic Studios.

In November 2016, Wagner replaced Vinita Nair on CBS This Morning Saturday. March 17, 2018 was her last appearance on CBS This Morning Saturday as she confirmed she would be leaving that show to co-host The Circus for Showtime, replacing Mark Halperin.

In 2020, Wagner launched a podcast with Crooked Media and Cadence13 that addressed the COVID-19 pandemic.

In March 2021, Wagner filled in for Nicolle Wallace on MSNBC's Deadline: White House.

In February 2022, Wagner filled in for Rachel Maddow on MSNBC's The Rachel Maddow Show, as well as Chris Hayes on All In with Chris Hayes. In June, it was announced that Wagner would host a show that assumes Maddows 9 PM slots on Tuesdays through Fridays as the former scaled back to Mondays only. Wagner's new show, Alex Wagner Tonight, premiered on August 16, 2022.

In September 2022, it was announced that Wagner will be hosting Netflix's The Mole reboot.

Political views
She has described herself as progressive. On matters involving Israel, she believes that there is an element of "trepidation that inhibits a robust discussion about Israel in the American media" due to fears of being falsely slurred as an anti-Semite.

Personal life
On August 30, 2014, Wagner married former White House nutrition policy advisor and assistant chef Sam Kass in a ceremony held at Blue Hill at Stone Barns, a restaurant in Pocantico Hills, New York. The wedding was attended by then U.S. President Barack Obama and his family, as Kass had been the Obama family personal chef since Chicago. Wagner and Kass's first child, Cyrus, was born in 2017. On April 16, 2019, she gave birth to their second child, Rafael.

Books
In April 2018, Futureface, her book about her Burmese American ancestry, was published.

References

External links

Now with Alex Wagner on MSNBC
Alex Wagner bio on MSNBC

1977 births
Living people
American people of Burmese descent
American political journalists
Brown University alumni
HuffPost writers and columnists
American magazine editors
American human rights activists
Women human rights activists
American television journalists
American women television journalists
American journalists of Asian descent
Journalists from Washington, D.C.
Woodrow Wilson High School (Washington, D.C.) alumni
MSNBC people
Activists from Washington, D.C.
American women journalists of Asian descent
21st-century American women